Monmouth Hawks basketball may refer to either of the basketball teams that represent Monmouth University:
Monmouth Hawks men's basketball
Monmouth Hawks women's basketball